The American Coleman was a line of semi trucks built from the 1950s into the 1970s. The company is based in Littleton, Colorado.

This truck was used in airfield operations, military applications, and for the Coleman Company to deliver their products to distributors. The cab-over design had no fifth wheel, instead the trucks frame locked into position by eight pins. This now made the trailer and tractor one unit. The truck had four single tires (no duals on this rig). The fuel economy was 6.5 mpg. The American Coleman semi truck was called the Space Star officially. This cab-over had two sleepers, one located just above the driver and the other was behind the driver. Servicing the engine was simple: just roll it out on its own independent frame, much like a drawer rolls out of a desk. The Space Star ran for few years.

References

Defunct truck manufacturers of the United States
Defunct manufacturing companies based in Colorado